Alexander Harris Clay (born 22 April 1992) is an American professional soccer player who last played as a midfielder for the Tampa Bay Rowdies 2 in the National Premier Soccer League.

Career

Youth and college
Alex Clay played  college soccer for UAB Blazers from 2011 to 2014 after transferring from the University of Kentucky. He also attended Randolph High School of Alabama. While with the Blazers he played in 51 matches scoring 9 goals and recording 10 assists.

Professional
Clay signed with New York Red Bulls II for the 2015 season and made his debut for the side in its first ever match on March 28, 2015 in a 0-0 draw with Rochester Rhinos. Clay played in 7 USL games in 2015, and also appeared in NYRBII's one U.S. Open Cup match. On October 29, 2015, it was announced that Clay's contract would not be renewed for the 2016 season.

On April 14, 2016, Clay was announced as a member of the initial roster for the Tampa Bay Rowdies' NPSL reserve team, Rowdies 2.

References

External links 
uabsports.com player profile 
ukathletics.com player profile

1992 births
Living people
American soccer players
Kentucky Wildcats men's soccer players
UAB Blazers men's soccer players
Ocala Stampede players
New York Red Bulls II players
Association football midfielders
Soccer players from Alabama
USL League Two players
National Premier Soccer League players
Tampa Bay Rowdies 2 players